Chaukori is a hill station in the Pithoragarh district set among the lofty peaks of the western Himalayan Range in the Kumaon Division of Uttarakhand, India. To its north is Tibet and to its south is Terai. The Mahakali River, running along its eastern boundary, forms the Indo-Nepal international border. This place has become a prominent tourist place and from here a wide and picturesque view of Himalayan range can be viewed. The golden yellow colour of sun rays falling on the Himalayan range in the morning time is really worth seeing. There are cottages available here where one can stay and enjoy the serene surroundings. Tourists coming to this place generally also visit the nearby tourist places like Patal Bhuvaneshwar,  Kausani, Bageshwar and Almora.

Geography
Chaukori is located in Berinag Tehsil of Pithoragarh district in Uttarakhand, India. It is situated 10km away from sub-district headquarter Berinag and 86km away from district headquarter Pithoragarh. Chaukori's elevation is 2010 m with spectacular panoramic views of the snowy peaks of Nanda Devi, Nanda Kot and the Panchchuli group.

Demographics
Chaukori is a medium size village located in Berinag of Pithoragarh district, Uttarakhand with total 248 families residing. Total population of Chaukori is 1163 out of which 672 are males while 491 are females as per Population Census 2011. In Chaukori, population of children with age 0-6 is 190 which makes up 16.34 % of total population. Average Sex Ratio of Chaukori is 731 which is lower than Uttarakhand state average of 963. Child Sex Ratio for Chaukori as per census is 624, lower than Uttarakhand average of 890. Chaukori has lower literacy rate as compared to Uttarakhand. In 2011, literacy rate of Chaukori was 76.36 % compared to 78.82 % of Uttarakhand. In Chaukori, Male literacy stands at 87.03 % while female literacy rate was 62.20 %. In Chaukori, most of the villagers are from Schedule Caste (SC). Schedule Caste (SC) constitutes 38.95 % while Schedule Tribe (ST) were 0.77 % of total population in Chaukori. In Chaukori, out of total population, 354 were engaged in work activities. 74.58 % of workers describe their work as Main Work (Employment or Earning more than 6 Months) while 25.42 % were involved in Marginal activity providing livelihood for less than 6 months. Of 354 workers engaged in Main Work, 45 were cultivators (owner or co-owner) while 1 were Agricultural labourer. As per constitution of India and Panchyati Raaj Act, Chaukori is administrated by a Sarpanch who is an elected representative of the village.

Temples
Gangolihat, 35 km away,  is an important religious centre with the Hat-Kalika temple. Also in the general area are the following temples:
 Mahakali Temple of Gangolihat
 Patal Bhuvaneshwar
 Mostamanu temple
 Nagmandir of Berinag
 Ghunsera Devi Temple
 Kedar  temple
 Nakuleshwar Temple
 Kamaksha Temple
 Kapileshwar Mahadev cave temple
 Ulkadevi Temple
 Jayanti Temple Dhwaj
 Arjuneshwar Shiva temple
 Kot Gari Devi
 Tripuradevi temple
 Maa bhagawati Devi temple
 Sri Moolnarayan temple

Transport
Chaukori is well connected with Motorable roads to major destinations in Kumaon. The Udiari Bend in Chaukori marks the intersection of roads coming from Kanda-Bageshwar, Seraghat-Almora and Thal-Munsiari. Seraghat is a tri-junction which is connecting to Naini through separate road via Dhankhet, Salla Bhatkot, Nali, Kunj Kimola etc village panchayat. Shared Taxis, locally called Jeeps are the mostly preferred for short distance Transport. Jeeps ply from Chaukori to the nearby towns of Berinag, Kanda and Thal. Buses are mostly used for Interstate Transport. Bus services are provided by the state owned 'Uttarakhand Transport Corporation' and the privately owned 'K.M.O.U bus Services'. Buses connect Chaukori with the cities of Bageshwar, Pithoragarh, Almora, Dharchula and Delhi. Distance from other cities and towns are listed below.
 Delhi - 530 km
 Kathgodam - 198 km via Almora and Bageshwar
 Nainital - 183 km

The closest railhead is 198 km at Kathgodam.

Image Gallery

Reference notes

External links
Temples in the general area
Pithoragarth District Website
Chaukori

Hill stations in Uttarakhand
Tourism in Uttarakhand
Villages in Pithoragarh district